Bramerton Street is a street in Chelsea, London. It runs roughly north to south from King's Road to Glebe Place. It was known as Caledonian Terrace until 1912.

The Gateways Club, a lesbian nightclub was based on the corner with King's Road, but with its entrance in Bramerton Street from 1931 to 1985, and was the longest-surviving such club in the world.

The socialist politician and writer Margaret Cole and her husband G. D. H. Cole, and the writer Ford Madox Ford was a visitor in 1920.

The film composer James Bernard lived in the street.

The grade II* listed West House is on the west side at the southern end of the street.

References

Streets in the Royal Borough of Kensington and Chelsea
Chelsea, London
King's Road, Chelsea, London